Luunja is a small borough in Tartu County, Estonia. It is the administrative centre of Luunja Parish. As of 2011 Census, the settlement's population was 518.

See also
JK Luunja

References

External links
Luunja Parish 

Boroughs and small boroughs in Estonia
Kreis Dorpat